Spouse for House is a television situation comedy on Mediacorp Channel 5 about a couple after their marriage.

Cast

 Selena Lee as Jessica Tan.
 Alaric Tay as John Tan
 Rebecca Spykerman as Vanessa De Souza, Jessica's best friend
 Desmond Tan as Tan Kai Lan (Kai), elder brother of John
 Irene Ang as Tan Soo Leng (Kitty), mother of John and Kai
 Richard Low as Tan Kok Wee, father of John and Kai
 Carrie Wong as Sarah Toh, former girlfriend of Kai
 Sue Tan as Doris Lee, mother of Jessica

References

External links

 Mediacorp Spouse for House on Facebook
 

Spouse for House me watch
2014 Singaporean television series debuts
English-language television shows
Mediacorp
Singaporean television sitcoms
Channel 5 (Singapore) original programming